Gnathophyllum americanum, commonly known as the striped bumblebee shrimp, is a species of shrimp that is common throughout tropical lagoons, bays, and reefs.

References

External links
 

Palaemonoidea
Crustaceans described in 1855
Pantropical fauna